James Moore is a historian of science at the Open University and the University of Cambridge and visiting scholar at Harvard University, is noted as the author of several biographies of Charles Darwin.  As a Cambridge research scholar and a member of the teaching staff at the Open University, he has studied and written about Darwin since the 1970s, co-authoring with Adrian Desmond the major biography Darwin, and also writing The Darwin Legend, The Post-Darwinian Controversies, and many articles and reviews.

Publications

James Moore. (1979). The Post-Darwinian Controversies: A Study of the Protestant Struggle to Come to Terms with Darwin in Great Britain and America, 1870-1900, Cambridge University Press

Notes

References
 Adrian Desmond and James Moore, Darwin, London: Michael Joseph, the Penguin Group, 1991, 
 The Darwin Legend, Hodder & Stoughton Religious, 1995,

External links
SOF: Evolution and Wonder - Understanding Charles Darwin (Speaking of Faith from American Public Media) Links to mp3 and transcript, as well as links to supporting material, including radio interview with James Moore.
Eden and Evolution, interview with James Moore and others.
 (pdf)
 Moore and Darwin on In Our Time

Harvard University staff
Living people
James Tait Black Memorial Prize recipients
Historians of biology
Charles Darwin biographers
Year of birth missing (living people)